Glen Aldrich (born December 20, 1957) is a New Hampshire politician.

Aldrich graduated from Shawnee High School.

On November 4, 2014, Aldrich was first elected to the New Hampshire House of Representatives where he represents the Belknap 2 district. Aldrich first assumed office on December 3, 2014. Aldrich is a Republican. In 2022, Aldrich was one of 13 Republicans to vote for a constitutional amendment to secede New Hampshire from United States. Aldrich was defeated in his 2022 attempt at re-election in the Republican primary.

Aldrich is married and has three children.

Aldrich resides in Gilford, New Hampshire.

References

Living people
People from Gilford, New Hampshire
Shawnee High School (New Jersey) alumni
Republican Party members of the New Hampshire House of Representatives
21st-century American politicians
1957 births